Bessarion was a Byzantine Greek scholar who became a Roman Catholic cardinal and Latin Patriarch of Constantinople.

Bessarion can also refer to:
 Bessarion of Egypt, (4th century – 5th century), Egyptian Christian monk
 Bessarion II of Larissa (1489/90–1540), Bishop of Larissa
 Bessarion station, the Toronto Transit Commission subway station
 Bessarion (crater), a lunar crater
 Bessarion (designer), Georgian fashion designer